Madelin is a surname and given name. Notable people with the name include:

Alain Madelin (born 1946), French politician
Louis Madelin (1871–1956), French historian
Madelin Coit, American multi-media artist
Madelin Riera (born 1989), Ecuadorian professional footballer
Michael Francis Madelin (1931–2007), British mycologist